Coale is a surname. Notable people with the surname include:

Ansley J. Coale (1917–2002), American demographer
Danny Coale (born 1988), American football player
Griffith Baily Coale (1890–1950), American painter
Robert Dorsey Coale (1857-1915), American colonel and scientist
Sherri Coale (born 1965), American women's basketball coach

See also
Coal
Coales (surname)
Cole (disambiguation)